Willem du Plessis (born 4 September 1955) is a former South African rugby union player.

Early life
Du Plessis was born in Somerset East in the Eastern Cape province of South Africa. His father, also named Willie, played provincial rugby for Eastern Province and his maternal grandfather, Michael Josias du Plessis played for Western Province in 1923 and 1924. Du Plessis was educated at Gill College in Somerset East and in 1973, represented North Eastern Cape at the annual Craven Week tournament. He also represented Eastern Province at the South African junior athletics championships.

Playing career
In 1975, du Plessis enrolled at Stellenbosch University for a degree in Physical Education and in 1977 made his debut for Western Province. Between 1977 and 1982, he played 67 matches for Western Province and was a member of the Western Province team that won the Currie Cup in 1982. Two of his brothers, Michael and Carel, were also in the 1982 Currie Cup winning team.

Du Plessis made his test debut for the Springboks against the visiting South American Jaguars team on 26 April 1980 and in so doing became the 500th Springbok rugby player. He was capped 14 times and scored 3 test tries for the Springboks. Du Plessis also played in six tour matches, scoring four tries for the Springboks. He retired at the end of the 1982 season, at the age of 26, to take up farming.

Test history

Accolades
In 1979, du Plessis was named one of the five South African Young Players of the Year, along with Darius Botha, Doug Jeffrey, Andre Markgraaff and Gawie Visagie.

Personal
Du Plessis is the brother of Michael du Plessis and Carel du Plessis, both former Springboks and the father of Lizaan du Plessis, a former professional tennis player. His fourth brother, Jacques du Plessis played provincial rugby for Western Province and Eastern Province. During the latter part of the 2000s, Du Plessis emigrated to Australia and resides in Sydney.

See also
List of South Africa national rugby union players – Springbok no. 500

References

1955 births
South African rugby union players
South Africa international rugby union players
Western Province (rugby union) players
Living people
People from Somerset East
Rugby union centres
Stellenbosch University alumni
Rugby union players from the Eastern Cape